Archinto (or Archinti) is a surname of a noble House of Milan, which included:
Carlo Archinto (1669-1732), Count, patron of arts in Milan
Filippo Archinto (1500–1558), Theologian and diplomat, Cardinal Archbishop of Milan
Giuseppe Archinto (1651–1712), Cardinal Archbishop of Milan
Gerolamo Archinto (1651–1710), Bishop of Vigevano
Gerolamo Archinto (1672–1721), Italian bishop, diplomat and historian
Alberico Archinto (1698–1758), Italian cardinal and papal diplomat 
Giovanni Archinto (1736–1799), Italian cardinal

Archinto
Archinto